The 1931 College Football All-America team is composed of college football players who were selected as All-Americans by various organizations and writers that chose College Football All-America Teams in 1931. The seven selectors recognized by the NCAA as "official" for the 1931 season are (1) Collier's Weekly, as selected by Grantland Rice, (2) the Associated Press, (3) the United Press, (4) the All-America Board, (5) the International News Service (INS), (6) Liberty magazine, and (7) the Newspaper Enterprise Association (NEA).

Consensus All-Americans

Following the death of Walter Camp in 1925, there was a proliferation of All-American teams in the late 1920s. For the year 1931, the NCAA recognizes seven published All-American teams as "official" designations for purposes of its consensus determinations. The following chart identifies the NCAA-recognized consensus All-Americans and displays which first-team designations they received.  The only unanimous All-America selections in 1931 were Tulane's Gerald "Jerry" Dalrymple and Notre Dame's Marchmont Schwartz.

Proliferation of All-American teams

In 1931, Damon Runyon wrote a column about the proliferation of "All-America" teams. He noted: "The 'All' boys are it, tooth and nail. They are 'All'-ing North, South East and West. They will wind up 'All'-Americaing, the most virulent form of the 'All' plague that besets us every Winter. The late Walter Camp little realized what he was bringing upon the country. ... At the moment, Mr. Camp probably had no idea that he was sowing the seed of a fearful pestilence." Runyon noted that Camp's word was viewed as gospel, but with his passing "the rush to fill his shoes was prodigious," and the "'All' business became a national obsession."

All-Americans of 1931

Ends
 Jerry Dalrymple, Tulane (AP–1; UP–1; COL–1; CP–1; NEA–1; INS–1; WCFF; LIB; HSM; CH-1; LP; AAB)
 Vernon Smith, Georgia (AP-1; COL–1; NEA–2; INS–2; HSM; CP–1; CH-2; LP)
 Henry Cronkite, Kansas State (AP–2; UP–1; NEA–1; INS-2; CP–3; CH-1)
 John Orsi, Colgate (AP–2; CP–2; NEA–2; INS-1; WCFF; CH-2; AAB)
 Paul Moss, Purdue (NEA–3; INS-3l CP–2; LIB)
 George Koontz, SMU (CP-3)
 Bill Hewitt, Michigan (NEA-3)
 Garrett Arbelbide, USC (AP-3)
 Fred Felber, North Dakota (AP-3)
 Herster Barres, Yale (INS-3)

Tackles
 Dallas Marvil, Northwestern (AP–1; NEA–3; INS-1; CP–1; CH-2; HSM)
 Jesse Quatse, Pittsburgh (UP–1; COL–1; CP-2; WCFF; CH-1; AAB)
 Jack Riley, Northwestern (NEA–1; INS-2; WCFF; AAB; LIB)
 Paul Schwegler, Washington (AP–1; COL–1; INS-3; CP–2)
 Joe Kurth, Notre Dame (AP–2; UP–1; NEA–1; INS–2; CP–3; LIB; LP)
 John "Jack" Price, Army (AP–3; CP–1; NEA–2; INS-1; CH-2)
 Jim MacMurdo, Pittsburgh (AP–2; NEA–3; INS-3; HSM)
 Ira Hardy, Harvard (NEA–2; CH-1; LP)
 Hugh Rhea, Nebraska (AP-3)
 Ray Saunders, Tennessee (CP-3)

Guards
 Biggie Munn, Minnesota (AP–1; UP–1; COL–1; NEA–1; INS–1; CP–1; HSM; CH-1; LP; WCFF; AAB)
 Johnny Baker, USC (AP–2; UP–1; NEA–1; INS–1; CP–2; WCFF; LIB; HSM; CH-2; LP; AAB)
 Herman Hickman, Tennessee (AP–3; COL–1; NEA–3; INS-3; CP–1; CH-1)
 Frank "Nordy" Hoffman, Notre Dame (AP-1; NEA–2; INS-2; LIB)
 Joe Zeller, Indiana (NEA-2)
 Jim Zyntell, Holy Cross (CP-2)
 James Evans, Northwestern (AP–2; CP-3)
 Maurice Dubofsky, Georgetown (NEA-3)
 Greg Kabat, Wisconsin (AP–3; CP-3)
 Milton Leathers, Georgia (INS-2)
 H. R. Myerson, Harvard (INS-3)
 Bill Corbus, Stanford (CH-2)

Centers
 Tommy Yarr, Notre Dame (AP–1; NEA–2; INS-1; WCFF; HSM; CH-2; AAB)
 Maynard Morrison, Michigan (AP–3; COL–1; NEA-1; CP–3)
 Ralph Daugherty, Pittsburgh (AP–2; NEA–3; INS–3; CP–1; LP)
 Charles Miller, Purdue (UP-1; CH-1)
 Stan Williamson, USC (LIB)
 Clarence Gracey, Vanderbilt (CP-2)
 McDuffie, Columbia (INS-2)

Quarterbacks
 Barry Wood, Harvard (AP–1; COL–1; NEA–1; INS-1; CP–1; HSM; CH-2)
 Austin Downes, Georgia (CP-3)
 William Morton, Dartmouth (AP–2; NEA–2; INS-3; CH-1)
 Carl Cramer, Ohio State (AP-3)

Halfbacks
 Marchmont Schwartz, Notre Dame (College Football Hall of Fame) (AP–1; UP–1; COL–1; NEA–1; INS–1; WCFF; LIB; HSM; CH-1; LP; AAB)
 Ernie Rentner, Northwestern (College Football Hall of Fame) (AP-1; UP–1; COL–1; NEA–1; INS–1 [named as fullback by Hearst]; CP–1; WCFF; HSM [named as fullback]; CH-1; LP; AAB)
 Don Zimmerman, Tulane (AP–2; NEA–2; INS-1; CP–1; CH-2)
 Bob Monnett, Michigan State (CP-1)
 Eugene McEver, Tennessee (AP–2; NEA–2; INS-2; CP–2)
 Bud Toscani, St. Marys (NEA-2)
 Cornelius Murphy, Fordham (CP-3; CH-2) {Murphy died from a ruptured blood vessel in the brain in December 1931}
 J. W. Crickard, Harvard (NEA-3)
 Albert J. "Mighty Atom" Booth, Jr., Yale (AP–3; INS-2)
 Weldon Mason, SMU (AP-3)
 Ray Stecker, Army (INS-3)

Fullbacks
 Gaius Shaver, USC (COL–1 [selected as fullback]; UP–1 [selected as quarterback]; NEA–3 [selected as quarterback]; INS–2 [selected as quarterback]; CP–1 [selected as fullback]; WCFF [selected as quarterback]; LIB; LP [selected as quarterback]; AAB)
 Erny Pinckert, USC (College Football Hall of Fame) (AP–1; NEA–1; INS–3 [picked as halfback]; LIB; HSM [named as halfback]; CH-1)
 Johnny Cain, Alabama (UP–1; NEA–3 [picked as halfback]; INS-3; WCFF; CH-2; AAB)
 Ralston "Rusty" Gill, California (NEA–3; LIB; LP)
 Orville Mohler, USC (AP-3; CP-2 [picked as quarterback])
 Jack Manders, Minnesota (CP-2)
 Bart Viviano, Cornell (AP-2)
 Clarke Hinkle, Bucknell (INS-2)
 Nollie Felts, Tulane (CP-3)

Key
Bold – Consensus All-American

Selectors recognized by NCAA in consensus determinations
 AAB = All America Board
 AP = Associated Press
 COL = Collier's Weekly as selected by Grantland Rice
 INS = International News Service, the wire service of the Hearst newspapers
 LIB = Liberty magazine
 NEA = Newspaper Enterprise Association
 UP = United Press

Other selectors
 CP = Central Press Association, also known as the Captain's Poll, selected by a poll of the captains of the major football teams
 WCFF = Walter Camp Football Foundation
 HSM = All-American team selected by 18,006 fans through nationwide contest sponsored by clothier Hart, Schaffner and Marx
 CH = College Humor magazine
 LP = selected by Lawrence Perry, a former Princetonian who wrote a nationally syndicated sports colyum called For The Game's Sake

See also
 1931 All-Big Six Conference football team
 1931 All-Big Ten Conference football team
 1931 All-Pacific Coast Conference football team
 1930 All-Southern football team
 1931 All-Southwest Conference football team

References

All-America Team
College Football All-America Teams